"Counterparts" is a short story by James Joyce published in his 1914 collection Dubliners. The story follows a day in the life of an alcoholic scrivener who is unsuccessful in his professional and personal life.

Plot 
The story recounts an evening in the life of a man named Farrington, frequently referred to simply as "the man". Farrington's difficulties begin at his clerical job when his boss — whom he addresses as "Mr. Alleyne" — berates him for not having finished an assignment. Instead of applying himself immediately to the task, the alcoholic Farrington slips out of the office for a glass of porter. When Alleyne yells at Farrington again, Farrington replies with an impertinent remark and has to apologize. It becomes evident that Farrington's relationship with his superior has never been a good one, partly due to Alleyne's overhearing of Farrington mocking his Ulster accent.

After work, Farrington pawns his watch-chain for drinking money and joins his friends for a night of drinking. Farrington's account of his standing up to his boss earns him some respect. However, his revelries end in two humiliations: a perceived slight by an elegant young woman and defeat in an arm-wrestling contest. Farrington goes home in a foul mood to discover that his wife is out at chapel. He tells his youngest son, Tom, to make dinner but as the child lets the fire in the kitchen go out, Farrington's rage explodes and he starts beating the little child with a walking stick. The story ends with Tom pleading for mercy.

Background and story title 
For Joyce's contemporaneous audience, the term "counterparts" could be expected to suggest (hand-written) duplicate copies of documents concerning office business. At the story's end, the man is seen to be the "counterpart" of his superior from his workplace, since Farrington abuses his subordinate child at home, just as Mr. Alleyne abuses his subordinate Farrington at the office.

References
Joyce, James. Dubliners (London: Grant Richards, 1914)

External links
 
 In "Farrington the Scrivener: A Story of Dame Street," Morris Beja compares "Counterparts" with "Bartleby, the Scrivener," by Herman Melville. The essay is published in Coping With Joyce: Essays from the Copenhagen Symposium, edited by Morris Beja and Shari Benstock (Ohio State University Press, 1989), pp. 111-122.

Short stories by James Joyce
1914 short stories